Red River Senior High School is a public, secondary school in Coushatta, Louisiana, United States. It is part of the Red River Parish School District and serves students in grades nine through twelve. The school's mascot is the Bulldog.

Formerly known as Coushatta High School, Red River Senior High is located at 915 East Carroll Street on a shared campus with the district's junior high school.

Athletics
Red River Senior High athletics competes in the LHSAA.

Notable alumni
Bennie Logan, NFL player

References

External links
Red River Senior High School
Red River Parish School District

Public high schools in Louisiana
Schools in Red River Parish, Louisiana